The Chile national roller hockey team is the national team side of Chile at international roller hockey. It is part of the FIRS Roller Hockey World Cup and CSP Copa America, and is controlled by the Federación Chilena de Hockey y Patinaje.

Tournament History

FIRS Roller Hockey World Cup

Roster
Roster for 2011 FIRS Men's Roller Hockey World Cup

External links
Federación Chilena de Hockey y Patinaje

National Roller Hockey Team
Roller hockey
National roller hockey (quad) teams